The 2022 Challenger de Santiago was a professional tennis tournament played on clay courts. It was the 16th edition of the tournament which was part of the 2022 ATP Challenger Tour. It took place in Santiago, Chile between 7 and 13 March 2022.

Singles main-draw entrants

Seeds

 1 Rankings are as of 28 February 2022.

Other entrants
The following players received wildcards into the singles main draw:
  Ignacio Becerra
  Diego Fernández Flores
  Daniel Antonio Núñez

The following players received entry from the qualifying draw:
  Hernán Casanova
  Evan Furness
  Facundo Juárez
  Paul Jubb
  Matteo Martineau
  Juan Bautista Torres

The following player received entry as a lucky loser:
  Daniel Dutra da Silva

Champions

Singles

  Hugo Dellien def.  Alejandro Tabilo 6–3, 4–6, 6–4.

Doubles

  Diego Hidalgo /  Cristian Rodríguez def.  Pedro Cachín /  Facundo Mena 6–4, 6–4.

References

2022 ATP Challenger Tour
2022
2022 in Chilean tennis
March 2022 sports events in Chile